A portal is an opening in a wall of a building, gate or fortification, especially a grand entrance to an important structure.

Doors, metal gates, or portcullis in the opening can be used to control entry or exit. The surface surrounding the opening may be made of simple building materials or decorated with ornamentation. The elements of a portal can include the voussoir, tympanum, an ornamented mullion or trumeau between doors, and columns with carvings of saints in the westwork of a church.

Examples

Other uses 
The term portal is also applied to the ends of a tunnel.

See also
Portico

References

Doors